Mere Bane Ki Baat Na Pucho is a Qawwali song. Qawwali is a form of traditional Sufi devotional music popular in South Asia, and this particular song is performed in Qawwali concerts, sometimes as a sing-along.

References

Qawwali songs
Indian songs